Margitta Troger is a retired East German slalom canoeist who competed in the late 1950s. She won a silver medal in the mixed C-2 event at the 1959 ICF Canoe Slalom World Championships in Geneva.

References

East German female canoeists
Living people
Year of birth missing (living people)
Medalists at the ICF Canoe Slalom World Championships